"My Friend" is a song by English electronic music duo Groove Armada, released as the second single from their third studio album, Goodbye Country (Hello Nightclub) (2001), on 5 November 2001.

Content 
The song features vocals by Celetia Martin and contains a sample from "Got to Learn How to Dance" by Fatback Band and samples a drum break from Skull Snaps' "It's a New Day". The lyrics are an interpolation from Brandy's 1995 hit "Best Friend".

Release 
The song was featured in a Dutch television commercial for Royal Club soft drinks in 2002, which resulted in a re-release of the single in the Netherlands and a higher charting in the Dutch singles charts than the year before.

Music video 
The music video features a woman going through a typical day at work, interspersed with scenes from a holiday with her friends.

Track listings 
CD
 "My Friend"
 "My Friend (Dorfmeister vs. Madrid de los Austrias Dub)"
 "My Friend (Swag's Good Buddy Remix)"

12-inch vinyl
 A1. "My Friend (Rabbit in the Moon's Old Soul Mix)" – 8:56
 A2. "My Friend (Album Version)" – 4:53
 B1. "My Friend (Dorfmeister vs. Madrid De Los Austrias Dub)" – 6:20
 B2. "My Friend (Kinnder "Oneness" Mix)" – 6:20
 C1. "My Friend (DJ Icey Around The Way Mix)" – 5:51
 C2. "My Friend (Rabbit in the Moon Dub)" – 9:08
 D1. "My Friend (Swag's Good Buddy Remix)" – 7:36
 D2. "My Friend (Swag's Version Dub)" – 7:12

Charts

Release history

References

External links 
 

Groove Armada songs
2001 singles
2001 songs
Jive Records singles
Songs written by Keith Crouch